is a former Japanese footballer.

Career

Abiko is the J-League's oldest debutant at age 39.

Club statistics

Notes

References

External links

Profile at YSCC Yokohama

1978 births
Living people
People from Sagamihara
Association football people from Kanagawa Prefecture
Japanese footballers
Japanese expatriate footballers
Association football forwards
J3 League players
Grêmio de Esportes Maringá players
Mito HollyHock players
YSCC Yokohama players
Japanese expatriate sportspeople in Brazil
Expatriate footballers in Brazil